William James Fulton (born 25 November 1968), known as Jim Fulton, is a Northern Irish loyalist. He was a volunteer in the Loyalist Volunteer Force (LVF), the paramilitary organisation founded in 1996 by Billy Wright and later commanded by his brother Mark "Swinger" Fulton until the latter's death in 2002.

He was convicted in 2006 of LVF-related crimes; these included having ordered the murder of a local Portadown woman and seven attempted murders. Fulton was sentenced to life in prison. His trial was the longest in the legal history of Northern Ireland.

Family
Fulton was born in Portadown, County Armagh, Northern Ireland in 1968. He is a son of Jim "Swinger" Fulton, a former British soldier, who worked as a window cleaner. His mother, Sylvia Prentice, came from a family of wealthy local car dealers. Fulton is married to Kelly, with whom he has several children.

Loyalist Volunteer Force
Along with his older brother Mark, also known as "Swinger", and cousin Gary, Jim Fulton was a close ally of Billy Wright in the Ulster Volunteer Force's Mid-Ulster Brigade. Some time in the early 1990s, Wright succeeded Robin Jackson as commander of the brigade. In 1992 Fulton was found guilty of possession of items for terrorist purposes and served nearly three years in prison. This was one of ten separate convictions he had picked by 2000.

The Fultons were founder members of the Loyalist Volunteer Force (LVF), which Wright had formed in 1996 after he and his Portadown unit were stood down by the UVF Brigade Staff in Belfast on 2 August 1996. This came about after the unauthorised killing of Catholic taxi driver Michael McGoldrick by gunmen from the Portadown unit of the Mid-Ulster Brigade during the Drumcree standoff when the UVF were on ceasefire. The killing has been reported as the first to be carried out by the LVF, although the unit remained within the UVF when it was carried out and were stood down by the Belfast-based Brigade Staff as a result of the attack. Wright took most of the members of his expelled unit with him.
Following the assassination of Billy Wright inside the Maze Prison in December 1997, Fulton's brother Mark took over as commander of the LVF.

In 2000 Fulton was arrested in California along with his wife Tanya and Odysseus and Mahatma Landry, two of the sons of LVF member Muriel Gibson, on charges of possession of firearms and explosives, as well as drugs charges. When all charges not related to drugs were dropped, campaigners seeking a full investigation into the murder of Rosemary Nelson asked the US Congress to investigate the circumstances surrounding the case. Fulton had left for the United States in 1999 soon after Nelson's killing, fuelling speculation that he had been involved.

Trial
Ultimately he was deported from the USA rather than facing the charges. Returning to the United Kingdom, he settled in Plymouth in south-west England. In the town he became associated with a gang of criminals and earned money working as a driver for them. Unbeknownst to Fulton, his associates were actually undercover police officers and as he opened up to them about his leading role in paramilitarism they secretly taped his confessions. After this surveillance operation, Fulton was arrested in 2002 and charged with 64 offences relating to terrorist activity. Following his arrest he was detained in HMP Maghaberry on a wing with just two other prisoners. One of these, his brother Mark, died there in June 2002. In a controversial move, Jim Fulton was freed on bail soon after the death of his brother.

Fulton was convicted in 2006 for several LVF-related crimes and sentenced to life in prison. Under British law, he will have to serve at least 28 years. He was convicted of ordering the 1999 murder of Elizabeth O'Neill, a 59-year-old Protestant grandmother whose home in Portadown's Corcrain estate was attacked with a pipe bomb because she was married to a Catholic. She had died after picking up a bomb thrown through her window as she watched television.

He was also found guilty of seven attempted murders - four of them arising from a home-made grenade attack on riot police during the Drumcree protests in 1998 - two drug offences and possession of a handgun used to murder Michael McGoldrick in 1996. In all Fulton was found guilty of 48 separate charges in a trial that proved to be the longest in the legal history of Northern Ireland. He was also acquitted of a further 14 charges. His associate was leading loyalist Muriel Gibson, who was indicted along with him.

Much of the evidence against Fulton consisted of claims he had made to undercover police officers while living in England. At his trial he claimed that he had lied in order to impress the officers, believing they were members of an important criminal "firm".

Following his sentencing by Mr Justice Hart, one of Fulton's supporters shouted angry abuse at the judge as he left the court: "Farce, scam, you're a disgrace to law and order".

References

1968 births
Living people
Loyalist Volunteer Force members
Ulster Volunteer Force members
Ulster loyalists imprisoned on charges of terrorism
Prisoners sentenced to life imprisonment by Northern Ireland
Irish people convicted of attempted murder
People from Portadown